Porisov is a Hasidic dynasty founded by Rebbe Yehoshua Osher Rabinowicz, son of Rebbe Yaakov Yitzchak Rabinowicz. The current Rebbe of Porisov is Rebbe Akiva Rabinowicz. 

Porisov is the Yiddish name of Parysów, a town in present-day Poland.

Lineage 
Lineage of the dynasty before World War II:

Rebbe Yehoshua Osher Rabinowicz
Rebbe Yaakov Tzvi Rabinowicz 
Rebbe Uri Yehoshua Elchanan Rabinowicz
Rebbe Yaakov Tzvi Rabinowicz 
Rebbe Avraham Rabinowicz
Rebbe Yehoshua Osher Rabinowicz
Rebbe Yaakov Tzvi Rabinowicz
Rebbe Yissachar Dov Rabinowicz
Rebbe Meir Shalom Rabinowicz
Rebbe Yehoshua Osher Rabinowicz
Rebbe Meir Shalom Rabinowicz
Rebbe Shmuel Mordechai Rabinowicz

See also
History of the Jews in Poland

References 

Hasidic dynasties of Poland
Orthodox Judaism in Poland